The Lassiter House, also known as the Treadwell House, is a historic residence in Autaugaville, Alabama.  The house was built in 1825 in the vernacular I-house style.  It was listed on the National Register of Historic Places on July 17, 1997.  It is also listed on the Alabama Register of Landmarks and Heritage.

See also
National Register of Historic Places listings in Autauga County, Alabama
Properties on the Alabama Register of Landmarks and Heritage in Autauga County, Alabama

References

National Register of Historic Places in Autauga County, Alabama
Houses completed in 1825
Properties on the Alabama Register of Landmarks and Heritage
I-houses in Alabama
Houses on the National Register of Historic Places in Alabama
1825 establishments in Alabama